Goeldia is a genus of spiders that occur in Central to South America.

Species
 Goeldia arnozoi (Mello-Leitão, 1924) (Brazil)
 Goeldia chinipensis Leech, 1972 (Mexico)
 Goeldia luteipes (Keyserling, 1891) (Brazil, Argentina)
 Goeldia mexicana (O. P.-Cambridge, 1896) (Mexico)
 Goeldia nigra (Mello-Leitão, 1917) (Brazil)
 Goeldia obscura (Keyserling, 1878) (Colombia, Peru)
 Goeldia patellaris (Simon, 1892)  (Venezuela to Chile)
 Goeldia tizamina (Chamberlin & Ivie, 1938) (Mexico)
 Goeldia zyngierae (Almeida-Silva, Brescovit & Dias, 2009) (Brazil)

References 

Titanoecidae
Araneomorphae genera
Spiders of South America
Spiders of Central America
Taxa named by Eugen von Keyserling